Valle Medio del Guadalquivir is a comarca in the province of Córdoba, Spain. It is occasionally referred to as "Vega del Guadalquivir", hence it is often confused with the comarca by the same name in Seville.  It contains the following municipalities:
 Almodóvar del Río
 Fuente Palmera
 Guadalcázar
 Hornachuelos
 La Carlota
 La Victoria
 Palma del Río
 Peñaflor
 Posadas

References 

Comarcas of Andalusia
Province of Córdoba (Spain)